Transmission.Alpha.Delta is the eighth studio album from American punk band, Strung Out. It was released on March 24, 2015, through Fat Wreck Chords. The album is their highest charting to date, reaching number 144 on the Billboard 200.

Track listing 
 "Rats in the Walls" - 3:32
 "Rebellion of the Snakes" - 3:39
 "The Animal and the Machine" - 3:13
 "Modern Drugs" - 3:38
 "Black Maps" - 4:15
 "Spanish Days" - 3:16
 "Tesla" - 4:03
 "Nowheresville" - 3:54
 "Magnolia" - 3:24
 "Go It Alone" - 3:10
 "No Apologies" - 3:20
 "Westcoasttrendkill"- 4:23

Charts

References 

Strung Out albums
2015 albums
Fat Wreck Chords albums